Home Valley is an unincorporated community in the Columbia River Gorge National Scenic Area along the Columbia River in Skamania County, Washington, United States. The community is located on Washington State Route 14 and lies southeast of nearby Carson.

History
The name "Home Valley" is a translation from the original Norwegian name "Heim Dal". A post office called Homevalley was in operation from 1892 until 1959.

Parks and recreation
Home Valley is situated within the Columbia River Gorge National Scenic Area and outside the southern end of Gifford Pinchot National Forest, which contains the nearby highland terrain areas of Wind Mountain and Dog Mountain.

See also

 List of unincorporated communities in Washington

References

Unincorporated communities in Skamania County, Washington
Unincorporated communities in Washington (state)